Leland David Hancock (born June 7, 1967) is an American former professional baseball player. He played two seasons in Major League Baseball as a pitcher for the Pittsburgh Pirates.

Hancock was selected by the Seattle Mariners in the fourth round of the 1988 Major League Baseball draft out of Cal Poly. On May 18, 1990, Hancock was traded to the Pirates in exchange for pitcher Scott Medvin and assigned to Double-A Harrisburg. In September 1995, he was called up to the majors along with Rick White. He made his Major League debut on September 3, 1995. He entered the game in the eighth inning in relief of Paul Wagner and allowed a run-scoring double to Brian Hunter, the only batter he faced. He pitched his final Major League game on May 13, 1996. He spent the remainder of the 1996 season, as well as the 1997 season, in the farm systems of the San Francisco Giants and Chicago Cubs. The 1997 season was his final as a professional baseball player.

References

External links

1967 births
Living people
American expatriate baseball players in Canada
Baseball players from California
Bellingham Mariners players
Buffalo Bisons (minor league) players
Cal Poly Mustangs baseball players
Calgary Cannons players
Carolina Mudcats players
Harrisburg Senators players
Major League Baseball pitchers
Orlando Rays players
People from North Hollywood, Los Angeles
Phoenix Firebirds players
Pittsburgh Pirates players
San Bernardino Spirit players
Williamsport Bills players